FOC or Far Out Corporation was the only studio album released by Australian collaborative rock group, Far Out Corporation (a.k.a. the FOC), in October 1998. Its title is an initialism of the group's name. It is the sole album from the group, which was produced by Tim Whitten and the FOC at Airlock Studios, East Brisbane, via Polydor Records.

For FOC the group's line-up were Ian Haug on lead guitar and vocals (from Powderfinger), Grant McLennan on lead guitar and vocals (ex-the Go-Betweens, solo), Ross MacLennan (no relation) on drums and guitar (ex-Turtlebox) and Adele Pickvance on bass guitar and vocals (from Dave Graney Band).

Australian musicologist, Ian McFarlane, described FOC, which "successfully blended a pop sensibility with a more cerebral orientation (reminiscent of Underground Lovers, New Order or Velvet Underground)." He observed the band were, "[a] conceptual art group with a pop orientation."

Track listing

Personnel

The FOC
 Ian Haug – lead guitar, vocals
 Grant McLennan – lead guitar, vocals
 Ross McLennan – drums, guitar
 Adele Pickvance – bass guitar, vocals

Additional musicians
 Matt Murphy – keyboards

Recording details
 Producer – Tim Whitten, the FOC at Airlock Studios, East Brisbane
 Audio engineer – Tim Whitten
 Mixing at Paradise Studios, Sydney

Artworks
 Cover art – Kino Ruin (design)

Notes

1998 albums
Far Out Corporation albums
Polydor Records albums